University Stadium is an on-campus stadium in Carrollton, Georgia that opened in 2009. It is primarily used for American football and is the home field of the University of West Georgia Wolves. The stadium holds 10,000 people.

Construction
In 2003, the University of West Georgia acquired 250 acres from the city of Carrollton for the purpose of creating a stadium and athletic complex. Such a facility would serve a dual role: give UWG sports teams a facility that they could use and aid the university in its quest to continue to attract additional students. The funding for this venture was made possible through private donations and increased student fees approved by the Student Government Association.

During the summer of 2008, construction began on this facility and, in the fall of 2009, University Stadium opened. The stadium seats roughly 9,000, providing ample space for any sporting or other entertainment event. Additionally, the new athletic complex includes a stadium and practice field for the Wolves’ soccer program, a new softball stadium, and a women’s field house with locker-room facilities for both women’s sports.

References

External links
University of West Georgia Athletics Official Website
University of West Georgia Stadium Campaign Website
University of West Georgia Stadium

College football venues
Sports venues in Georgia (U.S. state)
Buildings and structures in Carroll County, Georgia
University of West Georgia
West Georgia Wolves football